Melwin Beckman (born 5 August 2000) is a Polish handball player for HK Aranäs and the Polish national team.

References

2000 births
Living people
People from Kungsbacka
Expatriate handball players
Polish male handball players
21st-century Polish people